Mithai Mane is a 2005 Kannada-language film directed by Aarathi (whose daughter wrote the screenplay). The title was inspired by the Brothers Grimm fairy tale, Hansel and Gretel. The film explores the theme of how children would find fulfillment in a candy house they came across in a forest. Actually, the sweetness and fulfillment is illusory; the reality is that there is a witch living inside who uses the appearance of the house to catch children, so she can cook them and eat them.

Plot
Mithai Mane is the story of an 11-year-old girl named Ganga, who leaves from a poor village to work as a maid for a well-off family in the city. Her situation is compared throughout the movie to the plight of Gretel (held prisoner in the witch's cottage), and her story is interwoven with a voice-over narration of the Hansel and Gretel story. One of Ganga's tasks is to bring the household children's lunch boxes to their private school. At the school she is befriended by Swathi, a schoolgirl who wants to help her. As their friendship grows, Ganga becomes more aware of her surroundings. Child labor is at the heart of this film, but it is treated with gentle irony and there is no assignment of blame. The well-to-do family is self-absorbed and insensitive, not cruel and exploitative. The audience, however, has seen the plight of the villagers and the contrast with the opulence of the city-dwellers is obvious. The most powerful image is the open-eyed and honesty that Ganga brings with her from the village. These qualities will eventually force her to leave the sugar-coated house in the city where everything is a little too sweet. Ganga is played by child actor Aditi.

Cast and crew
Mithayi Mane was produced by Chandrasekar Desigoudar, and the score was composed by N. S. Prasad. Among the cast were Aditi, Dharmendra Urs, Surabhi J. Herur, Hanumantha Raju, Ragashree Prasad, Akshara, Deeksha Naik, Panchami, Lakshmi Nada Gowda, Padma Shimoga, Shailashree, Suchitha Anthunadhan, Pallavi and Raghavendra. The film was directed by former Kannada actress Aarathi, based on a short story written by her daughter Yashaswini.

Santosh Rai Pathaje was the cinematographer; in addition to his camera work, he has also directed Savi Savi Nenapu and Seven O' Clock.

Awards
Mithayi Mane won the Best Children's Film award for 2004–05 issued by the Government of Karnataka, and Aditi won the Best Child Actor award for her role in the film.
Aditi also won an International award "the Golden Cairo Award" in her debut for the film Mithayi Mane.

References

External links

http://www.viggy.com/interview/arathi.asp
https://web.archive.org/web/20080512211740/http://www.my-kannada.com/n/a/arc8-2005.shtml
https://web.archive.org/web/20061105103849/http://wwwin.kodak.com/IN/plugins/acrobat/en/motion/publications/images/archived/janmarch05.pdf

2000s Kannada-language films
Indian children's films
2005 directorial debut films
2005 films